Oboronia guessfeldti, the Güssfeldt's blue or Güssfeldt's ginger white, is a butterfly in the family Lycaenidae. It is found in Senegal, Guinea-Bissau, Guinea, Sierra Leone, Liberia, Ivory Coast, Ghana, Togo, Nigeria (south and the Cross River loop), Cameroon, the Republic of the Congo, the Central African Republic, Angola, the Democratic Republic of the Congo (Uele, Tshopo, Equateur, Sankuru and Lualaba), Uganda, western Kenya and northern Zambia. The habitat consists of drier forests, Guinea savanna and rarely also wet forests.

Both sexes are attracted to flowers.

The larvae feed on Costus (including Costus dewiveri) and possibly Zingiber species.

References

Butterflies described in 1879
Polyommatini
Butterflies of Africa
Taxa named by Hermann Dewitz